Becken is a German surname. Notable people with the surname include:

Bobby Becken, Canadian voice actor
Pierre Becken (born 1987), German footballer

See also
Becken, in music scores, indicates cymbals
Becker

German-language surnames